Justin Elmer Wilson (April 24, 1914 – September 5, 2001) was a Southern American chef and humorist known for his brand of Cajun-inspired cuisine, humor and storytelling.

"Cajun" humorist
Wilson was born in Roseland near Amite, the seat of Tangipahoa Parish, one of the "Florida Parishes" of southeastern Louisiana. He was the second-youngest of seven children of Harry D. Wilson, the Louisiana Commissioner of Agriculture and Forestry from 1916 to 1948 and a former member of the Louisiana House of Representatives. 

While Wilson presented himself as Cajun in his act, it is unclear if he had any actual Acadian or French ancestry. His father Harry Wilson was of Welsh descent. Justin Wilson described his mother, the former Olivet Mintern Toadvin (1880–1976), as Cajun, but she has no known ancestors who either were Acadian, lived in the Cajun regions of Louisiana, or emigrated from France. (She did, however, teach Justin how to cook.) Her surname Toadvin derives from a native of Guernsey who immigrated to Maryland circa 1675. The Florida Parishes, where the family lived, were not part of the French or Spanish colonies of Louisiana.

Wilson began his career as a safety engineer while he traveled throughout Acadiana. The safety lectures that he made to refinery workers prompted him to become a Cajun storyteller. He remembered it this way on the back cover of The Justin Wilson Cook Book:

Way back when I first started as a safety engineer, I took myself pretty seriously, and I found I was putting my audiences to sleep.  So having lived all my life among the Cajuns of Louisiana, and having a good memory for the patois and the type of humor Cajuns go for, I started interspersing my talks on safety with Cajun humor.

Wilson later recorded several comedy albums, beginning with The Humorous World of Justin Wilson on Ember Records. He also recorded several albums for Jewel Records on the Paula label and a few for  Capitol Records. He later appeared as a guest on the popular CBS series The Ed Sullivan Show. He was known for the catchphrase, "I gar-on-tee!" (I guarantee).
As a comedian, Wilson was enormously popular in Louisiana, and to a lesser degree in neighboring states, but his humor may have been a little too specifically regional to enjoy the wider popularity of Southern comics such as Jerry Clower or Archie Campbell.

He composed ten songs, as well as composing the background music for his cooking show, and recorded one album of Christmas songs with a jazz band. Wilson wrote seven Cajun cookbooks and two books of Cajun stories. He hosted several cooking shows on Public Broadcasting Services (PBS) and at least one in 1975, for Mississippi Educational Television (ETV), that combined Cajun cooking and humor. Most were aired from the studios of WYES-TV in New Orleans.

Wison appeared in a series of television commercials for Cajun Spice Ruffles potato chips duuring the late 1980s. In 1997, he published the cookbook "Looking Back", which combined his first two cookbooks in a hardcover format, with additional photos, and notes on how his cooking techniques had changed (e. g., using olive oil instead of oleo) since those early cookbooks were published. A companion series was produced, also titled "Looking Back" and broadcast nationwide on PBS, which was a repackaging of Wilson's first cooking show from 1971, with new intros by Wilson himself. This was the first time the 1971 programs were ever seen nationwide, as they were originally produced by Mississippi Educational Television and, at that time, were only broadcast regionally.

Southern author Harnett T. Kane said of Wilson: "I know of no one [else] who portrays the Louisiana Cajun as well, so skillfully and entertainingly".

But Wilson faced criticism from many Cajuns who viewed his humor as degrading, especially from a non-Cajun essentially doing a Cajun impression. Attorney and cultural activist Paul Tate described Wilson "a redneck telling jokes for rednecks." James Domengeaux, a former member of Congress and founder of CODOFIL, considered Wilson a degrader of the Cajun people.

Politics
As the son of the former agriculture commissioner who died in office in 1948, Wilson was politically active in his early years. In 1951–1952, Justin Wilson was the manager of the unsuccessful Democratic gubernatorial campaign of Lieutenant Governor William J. "Bill" Dodd. He and Dodd were close though they often disagreed on political philosophy. Wilson's brother-in-law, Bolivar Edwards Kemp, Jr., was the Democratic attorney general of Louisiana from 1948 to 1952, while Dodd was lieutenant governor. Kemp served between the two terms of Attorney General Fred S. LeBlanc of Baton Rouge.

Known for his emphasis on patriotic themes, Wilson over the years became involved in numerous Louisiana political campaigns. Former State Senator Don W. Williamson of Caddo Parish recalls Wilson having cut a commercial for Williamson's Democratic challenge in 1979 to incumbent Insurance Commissioner Sherman A. Bernard. Williamson recalls that Wilson just volunteered to help him. Williamson only narrowly lost to Bernard, who later was imprisoned for fraud in the handling of his state job duties.

Wilson was a segregationist, speaking at least twice at national leadership conferences of the Citizens' Councils, alongside Lester Maddox, John Rarick, and John G. Schmitz.

Personal life
Justin Wilson was married four times. His third wife died and his three other marriages ended in divorce. He had one son and three daughters: Harry D. Wilson II, Sara Sue, Pam, and Menette. Wilson's last residence was in Summit in Pike County, Mississippi. He died on September 5, 2001, of heart failure in Baton Rouge, Louisiana. He is interred beside his third wife at Port Vincent Community Cemetery (also known as Saint William Catholic Cemetery) in Port Vincent in Livingston Parish.

Bibliography

By Justin Wilson
 The Justin Wilson Cook Book (1965)
 Justin Wilson's Cajun Humor (1974)
 The Justin Wilson #2 Cookbook: Cookin' Cajun (1979)
 Justin Wilson's Cajun Fables (1982)
 The Justin Wilson Gourmet and Gourmand Cookbook (1984)
 More Cajun Humor (1984)
 Justin Wilson's Outdoor Cooking with Inside Help (1986)
 Justin Wilson's Homegrown Louisiana Cookin' (1990)
 Justin Wilson Looking Back: A Cajun Cookbook (1997)
 Justin Wilson's Easy Cookin': 150 Rib-Tickling Recipes for Good Eating (1998)

Other authors
William J. "Bill" Dodd, Peapatch Politics: The Earl Long Era in Louisiana Politics.  Baton Rouge: Claitor's Publishing, 1991.
Kevin S. Fontenot, "How Y'all Are:  Justin Wilson and Cajun Comedy" in  Accordions, Fiddles, Two Step and Swing:  A Cajun Music Reader. Ryan A. Brasseaux and Kevin S. Fontenot, eds.  Lafayette:  The Center for Louisiana Studies, 2006.

Discography (partial)

References

External links
 
 

1914 births
2001 deaths
20th-century American Episcopalians
20th-century American male writers
20th-century American screenwriters
American cookbook writers
American humorists
American male chefs
American male non-fiction writers
American male television writers
American people of French descent
American people of Welsh descent
American segregationists
American television chefs
American television writers
Cajun people
Louisiana cuisine
People from Summit, Mississippi
People from Tangipahoa Parish, Louisiana
Screenwriters from Louisiana
Screenwriters from Mississippi